Utpal Shanghvi Global School (USGS) is a private school in J.V.P.D Scheme area of, Juhu, Mumbai, India. The school follows the SSC state board syllabus and the Cambridge University certified IGCSE syllabus. In 1994, the school was first in India to get ISO 9001 certification. It also offers the International Baccalaureate curriculum.

Foundation
Utpal Shanghvi Global School is managed by Juhu Parle Education Society and started in June 1982, with pre-primary and primary divisions following the Maharashtra state board. The secondary section of the school commenced the following year in June 1983. The curriculum of International General Certificate of Secondary Education (IGCSE) developed by Cambridge International Examinations (CIE) was introduced in 2005.

Extra-curricular activities 
The school celebrates its annual function day, Blitzing, in December every year. In 2017, around 3000 people, being the school's staff, students, and their parents, arranged and participated in a cleanliness drive on Children's Day supporting the Swachh Bharat Abhiyan. Various students of the school have represented in sports competitions on state, national and international levels in table tennis, badminton, judo, and football.

Ranking 
The school became the first Indian school to receive ISO 9001 certification in 1994. In 2011, student Payoshaa Shah received the Dr Manmohan Singh Scholarship. It also received the International School Award by British Council for 2015–16. The school has been ranked as 8th and 6th in the Mumbai Western suburbs region by Hindustan Times in the years 2016 and 2017 respectively. In 2019, around 23% students of the 170 who appeared for the International General Certificate of Secondary Education secured above 90% marks. The principal of school, Rakhi Mukherjee, noted that the school's average was 84% marks in the IGCSE exams and that all students first class and above. Reports of students securing top ranks in IGCSE exams have been covered in national level newspapers.

Notable alumni and faculty 
 Alumni
 Aditya Narayan, singer, actor, TV show host 
 Shriya Pilgaonkar, actress
 Vatsal Sheth, actor
Pushtiie Shakti, actor
Adhyayan Suman, actor (son of actor Shekhar Suman ) 
Yaashna Bhalekar, cricketer 

 Faculty
 Jyoti Gauba, teacher turned actress, taught mathematics at school.

References

Educational institutions established in 1982
Schools in Mumbai
Private schools in Mumbai
1982 establishments in Maharashtra